Chadwick Steven McQueen (born December 28, 1960) is a former American actor, film producer, martial artist, and race-car driver. As an actor and producer, he was known for playing Dutch in The Karate Kid and The Karate Kid Part II. He is the only son of actor Steve McQueen.

Early life 
Chadwick Steven McQueen was born on December 28, 1960, in Los Angeles to actors Steve McQueen and Neile Adams. From an early age, McQueen was an avid enthusiast of automobiles, motorcycles, and racing, interests that he inherited from his father. He began racing dirt bikes by age 9 and, in three years, went on to win his class in the World Mini Grand Prix. He quickly moved on to auto racing, winning his first race: the Mini Le Mans event, a children-only track created on the set of the 1971 film Le Mans, when McQueen was 10 years old. Before filming was completed on that film, McQueen enjoyed racing at triple-digit speeds down the straights while seated in his father's lap at the wheel of a Porsche 917. At 12, he won his class at the World Mini Grand Prix.

Acting career 
McQueen has worked as a film actor for some time, appearing as Dutch in The Karate Kid in 1984 and The Karate Kid Part II in 1986, Sean Thompson in Martial Law (with Cynthia Rothrock) in 1991 and many other roles including a role in the 1993 film New York Cop with Mira Sorvino and in the action films Red Line as Jim and Death Ring. He has also worked as a producer, winning a Telly Award for his documentary Filming at Speed. He has appeared on numerous television programs related to motorsports, including Hot Rod TV and Celebrity Rides. Attempts were made to arrange for him to reprise his role as the character Dutch in season two of the YouTube series Cobra Kai, but commitments to his company, McQueen Racing, added to the fact that McQueen is no longer interested in acting, prevented this.

Racing career 
His professional racing career started in the Sports Car Club of America (SCCA). McQueen has competed in several types of racing from Motocross to the Baja 1000. He teamed with Belgian racing legend Jacky Ickx and his daughter Vanina, piloting a trio of Porsche 959s restored by Porsche Motorsports for the 2004 Goodwood event. Also in 2004, he qualified for the SCCA Runoffs, winning multiple events. Racing for Westernesse Racing, he finished fourth.

In January 2006, he was seriously injured (suffering a broken lower left leg, two fractures to his vertebrae, and multiple rib fractures) in an accident at the Daytona International Speedway while practicing for the 24 Hours of Daytona Sports Car race. McQueen now says that his driving days are over.  He returned to Daytona during the 2007 Rolex 24 Hours of Daytona race to thank the medics and track workers who he says saved his life. Later on, he stated that he wants to become a team owner.

In November 2007, he returned to the Daytona International Speedway and got behind the wheel of the Brumos 1975 Ecurie Escargot RSR, driving it in the exhibitions at the Porsche Rennsport Reunion III.

In January 2010, he started McQueen Racing, LLC, a company that partners with leaders in the motorcycle and custom-car industries towards development of high-performance, limited-edition custom cars, motorcycles, and accessories.

Personal life 
Chad McQueen dated Jill Henderson White Pasceri in the 1980s, a USEF Equestrian rider and horse trainer. Jill is the daughter of trombonist Jimmy Henderson. He was married to Stacia Toten (who later wed Hockey Hall of Famer Luc Robitaille) from 1987–90. The couple had one son, actor Steven R. McQueen (b. 1988), who was a regular in the TV series The Vampire Diaries and Chicago Fire. McQueen married Jeanie Galbraith in 1993. They have two children: Chase McQueen (b. 1995) and Madison McQueen (b. 1996).

Filmography

References

External links 

McQueen Racing, LLC
Garrett, Jerry (March 24, 2010). "Steve McQueen: 30 Years Gone, Not Close to Forgotten". The New York Times.

American male film actors
American people of Scottish descent
American male actors of Filipino descent
Male actors of Filipino descent
20th-century American male actors
21st-century American male actors
Male actors from Los Angeles
Atlantic Championship drivers
SCCA Formula Super Vee drivers
Racing drivers from Los Angeles
1960 births
Living people
Film producers from California
Male actors from California